Sukhen Dey (born 28 March 1989) is an Indian Weightlifter from Howrah, West Bengal. He won Gold medal in the men's 56 kg weight class at the 2014 Commonwealth Games in Glasgow, Scotland and previously won a silver medal at the 2010 Commonwealth Games at Delhi. Dey left behind Malaysia's Mohd Pisol Zulheimi with the Silver medal and Ganesh Mali with Bronze medal.

References
K Sanjita Chanu wins India's first gold in 20th Commonwealth Games 2014

Living people
Weightlifters from West Bengal
Indian male weightlifters
Weightlifters at the 2010 Asian Games
1989 births
Weightlifters at the 2014 Commonwealth Games
Commonwealth Games gold medallists for India
Weightlifters at the 2014 Asian Games
Commonwealth Games silver medallists for India
Weightlifters at the 2010 Commonwealth Games
Commonwealth Games medallists in weightlifting
People from Howrah district
Asian Games competitors for India
20th-century Indian people
21st-century Indian people
Medallists at the 2010 Commonwealth Games
Medallists at the 2014 Commonwealth Games